Trombidium toldti is a species of mite in the genus Trombidium in the family Trombidiidae. It is found in Austria.

Name
This species is named in honor of acarologist K. Toldt.

References
 Synopsis of the described Arachnida of the World: Trombidiidae

Further reading
  (1928):  Über die Trombidiose in den Österreichischen Alpenländen. ..Denkschriften-Akademie der Wissenschaften''.

Trombidiidae
Arachnids of Europe
Animals described in 1928